Symbiotes gibberosus is a species of beetle in the family Anamorphidae. It is found in Africa, Europe and Northern Asia (excluding China), and North America.

References

Further reading

External links

 

Coccinelloidea
Beetles described in 1849